Lt Gen Faiz Ali Chishti is a Pakistani three-star rank general officer and former field commander of X Corps. He joined British Indian army in 1946 as artillery officer and later joined Pakistan army after partition in 1947. He was architect of 1977 martial law imposed in Pakistan. He wrote book Betrayals of Another Kind. Islam, Democracy and the Army in Pakistan  detailing President Zia-ul-Haq and coup of 1977.

References

Pakistani generals
Military coups in Pakistan
Military government of Pakistan (1977–1988)
Living people
Year of birth missing (living people)